The 2020 San Diego County Board of Supervisors election was held on Tuesday, November 3, 2020, with the primary election held on March 3, 2020. While the San Diego County Board of Supervisors is officially a nonpartisan institution, Republicans controlled four out of the five supervisory seats, while a Democrat held one. However, the election resulted in a Democratic majority for the first time in decades after Nora Vargas and Terra Lawson-Remer respectively won supervisorial elections in the first and third districts.

Background
Even though county supervisor elections are officially nonpartisan in California, Republicans held a 4–1 majority in the San Diego County Board of Supervisors heading into the 2020 election, with the one being a lone Democrat.

Results
In the general election, Democrats Nora Vargas and Terra Lawson-Remer respectively won supervisory seats in the first and third districts, assuring a Democratic majority in the next term and for the first time in a generation.

First district

Second district

Third district

Post-election
On January 5, 2021, the Board of Supervisors elected Nathan Fletcher as the new chair, succeeding Greg Cox.

References

San Diego County
San Diego County Board of Supervisors
2020s in San Diego